An agaric is a type of  fungus fruiting body characterized by the presence of a pileus (cap) that is clearly differentiated from the stipe (stalk), with lamellae (gills) on the underside of the pileus. In the UK, agarics are called "mushrooms" or "toadstools". In North America they are typically called "gilled mushrooms". "Agaric" can also refer to a basidiomycete species characterized by an agaric-type fruiting body. 

Archaically, agaric meant 'tree-fungus' (after Latin agaricum); however, that changed with the Linnaean interpretation in 1753 when Linnaeus used the generic name Agaricus for gilled mushrooms.

Most species of agaricus belong to the order Agaricales in the subphylum Agaricomycotina. The exceptions, where agarics have evolved independently, feature largely in the orders Russulales, Boletales, Hymenochaetales, and several other groups of basidiomycetes. Old systems of classification placed all agarics in the Agaricales and some (mostly older) sources use "agarics" as the colloquial collective noun for the Agaricales. Contemporary sources now tend to use the term euagarics to refer to all agaric members of the Agaricales. "Agaric" is also sometimes used as a common name for members of the genus Agaricus, as well as for members of other genera; for example, Amanita muscaria is sometimes called "fly agaric".

References

External links
"Gilled Mushrooms" at AmericanMushrooms.com
"Evolution & Morphology in the Homobasidiomycetes" by Gary Lincoff & Michael Wood, MykoWeb.com

Fungal morphology and anatomy
Mushroom types